These are the Billboard magazine R&B albums that reached number one in 1976.

Chart history

See also
1976 in music
R&B number-one hits of 1976 (USA)

1976
1976 record charts